Pitch Black may refer to:

Film
 Pitch Black (film), a 2000 science fiction movie
 Pitch Black, the boogeyman in the animated film Rise of the Guardians

Music
 Pitch Black Records, a Cyprus-based record label established in 2007
 Pitch Black (band), a New Zealand electronica band
 Pitch Black (album), or the title song, by Rifftera, 2015
 Pitch Black (EP), or the title song, by Meshuggah, 2013
 "Pitch Black", song by Tove Lo from Blue Lips
 "Pitch Black", song by Vicetone

Other uses
 Exercise Pitch Black, a biennial international military exercise hosted by the Royal Australian Air Force
 Mountain Dew Pitch Black, a flavor of the soft drink Mountain Dew